Jimmy Algerino (born 28 October 1971 in Toulouse, France) is a French former professional football defender.

He most notably played for Paris Saint-Germain for five seasons and then had a short spell in Italy at S.S.C. Venezia.

Titles
 European Supercup: 1996 runner-up
 UEFA Cup Winners' Cup Final 1997 runner-up
 Coupe de France: 1998
 Coupe de la Ligue: 1998
 Trophée des Champions: 1998
 Coupe de France: 2004 runner-up

References

External links

Jimmy Algerino profile

Living people
1971 births
People of Apulian descent
Footballers from Toulouse
French footballers
Association football defenders
Chamois Niortais F.C. players
AS Monaco FC players
SAS Épinal players
LB Châteauroux players
Paris Saint-Germain F.C. players
Venezia F.C. players
FC Sochaux-Montbéliard players
A.C. Legnano players
Expatriate footballers in Italy
French expatriate footballers
Ligue 1 players
Serie A players
French sportspeople of Italian descent